The Cathedral of Tarragona is a Roman Catholic church in Tarragona, Catalonia, Spain. The edifice is located in a site previously occupied by a Roman temple dating to the time of Tiberius, a Visigothic cathedral, and a Moorish mosque. It was declared a national monument in 1905.

History
There is little information about the origins of the church. A chapter is known to have existed in Tarragona in the late 11th century, but the current edifice was built only from 1154 by order of archbishop Bernat Tort, according to the Augustinian rule, to be entrusted to monks from the monastery of St. Rufus in Avignon. 

The original, early-12th-century cathedral had perhaps a single nave and a large apse, and was in Romanesque architectural style. At the time attention was posed to defensive elements, such as the massive bell tower, annexed to the sacristy. A new project was launched in 1195, changing the church's plan to a basilica one, adding two aisles and a transept with four new secondary apses, covered by cross vaults in Gothic style. The construction benefited of donations from bishops and kings Alfons II and Peter IV of Aragon.

Part of the new edifice was opened to worship under bishop Aspàreg de la Barca (1215–1234). In 1250 Pere d'Albalat ordered the construction of a tower-dome over the transept and in 1277 Bartolomeu de Girona was commissioned the realization of the main portal. The tympanum and the apostles figures of the latter are however were executed by Jaume Cascalls and his workshop (including Jordi de Déu) around 1375. The new cathedral was consecrated by archbishop John of Aragon and Anjou, son of king James II, in 1331.

Works of restorations of the cathedral were carried on in 1999–2001. During them, traces of a temple dedicated to the Roman emperor Augustus were found, situated under the nave.

Architecture

Interior
The cathedral is in a transitional style between Romanesque and Gothic. It has a basilica plan with a nave and two aisles, a transept with unequal arms, three semicircular apses with deep presbyteries. The apse has three windows in the lower part, and other seven in the upper one, of ogival shape.

The nave has a height of 26 metres at the dome, a length and a width of 16.5 m, while the aisles are 13 m height and 8.25 m wide. The length of the main axle is 101 metres.  The nave and the aisles are covered by cross vaults whose ribs are supported by cruciform pilasters annexed to columns; the capitals of the latter feature Moorish motifs. The windows are of two main type: Romanesque, with archivolts, and Gothic, with stained glasses.

The octagonal tower-dome was built in the mid-13th century, and is cross-vaulted. The presbytery and the apse have kept a notable Romanesque pavement, formed by plaques of stone and marble of different colours in geometrical patterns.

The stalls of the choir were made by the Saragossan artist Francisco Gomar in the 15th century, in oak wood. The western side was dismantled and is now in a museum. The organ is from the late 16th century, designed by the architect Jaume Amigó.

Chapels
The church includes the following chapels, starting from to the right of the entrance towards the choir:
Chapel of the Virgin Mary (1520). The altarpiece, coming from the parish church of Solivella, was executed by Mateu Ortoneda in the early 15th century.
Chapel of the Virgin of Montserrat, with an altarpiece from the church of Santes Creus, begun by Guerau Gener and finished by Lluís Borrassà in the early 15th century.
Chapel of the Conception. in Baroque style (1674), with works by sculptor Francesc Grau and painter Francesc Tramulles Roig.
Chapel of St. Fructuous and St. John, designed in Renaissance style by Pere Blai
Chapel of the Holy Sepulchre (1494), housing a 4th-century AD Roman sarcophagus with Gothic additions (Gothic made by an anonymous Valencian sculptor) 
Chapel of the Holiest (1592), in the right transept. It features a large triumphal arch as entrance, an octagonal dome, three chapels with semicircular arches and works from Jaume Amigó, Pere Blai and Bernat Càceres
Chapel of St. Barbara (14th century)
Chapel of St. Mary of the Taylors, built before 1350 and later renovated. It has a hexagonal plan and features an extraordinary polychrome stone altarpiece (1368) by Aloi de Montbrai.
Major Chapel, featuring a notable Gothic sculpture by Pere Johan (1426–1434) in polychrome alabaster
Chapel of St. Oleguer
Chapel of St. Luke 
Chapel of St. Thomas (16th century)
Chapel of the Christ the Healer (15/16th century)
Chapel of the Rosary (16th century)
Chapel of the Presentation
Chapel of St. Francis (1584), designed by Jaume Amigó
Chapel of St. Tecla, patroness of Tarragona, built in 1777 in late Baroque style over what was once the baptistery
Chapel of St. Michael and All the Angels (mid-14th century). It contains a sculpture decoration with angels attributed to Jaume Cascalls and an altarpiece, depicting St. Michael, by Bernat Martorell (15th century) from the church of La Pobla de Cérvoles.
Chapel of the Baptistery (1340–1344), with numerous sculptures featuring the Evangelists with their symbols, and other human and saint figures

Exterior

The unfinished main façade has three portals, corresponding to the nave and the aisles; the central one is in a Gothic style with similarities to that in the Cathedrals of Amiens and Reims, with ogival arcades, while the other two are in Romanesque style. The main gate is surmounted by a large rose window, similar to that in the Monastery of Sant Cugat or in the Cathedral of Majorca. The twelve spokes represent the twelve tribes of Israel, or the apostles. It has a diameter of 11 meters. The two lateral portal have also smaller rose windows.

The main gate, executed by master Bartolomeu from 1277 to c. 1291, features ogival arches of decreasing size enclosed in a square-like tympanum. Below each archivolt, and in the lower section of the side pilasters, are figures with saints and prophets, by Jaume Cascalls and his workshop. Another statue, depicting the Virgin Mary, divides the entrance in two. Its pedestal shows scenes of the Genesis, with the creation of Adam and Eve and the Original Sin. Over the door is an ogival tympanum with the Final Judgement, presided by Christ and Angels, over which is a Gothic window executed by Jaume Cascalls and his workshop in 1375. In the interior, in correspondence to this tympanum, are representations of the Virgin with Saints and two angels. The doors, in cast iron, date to the 15th century.

Cloister

The construction of the cloister began perhaps around 1194, although other scholars assign it from 1214 onwards. Located northeast to the cathedral, it has a rectangular plan, measuring 47 by 46 meters. It has a large central courtyard and four galleries divide by pilasters.  Some of them include gutters discharging rainwater to the Roman sewer, which was still in use. The vault covering of the galleries follows the model of the monasteries of Poblet and Vallbona de les Monges. 

The arcades of the galleries are organized in groups of three smaller circular arches, surmounted by couples of small rose windows and, above them, a large ogival arch. Above the latter is in turn a frieze in Moorish style. The capitals of the columns are sculpted with religious scenes, such as the visit of the angels to Abraham, Cain and Abel an others. At the corner of the northern gallery are scenes from the Genesis and the New Testament, St. Thomas' incredulity and the legend of St. Nicholas. The wall of the eastern gallery includes an Arab inscription from the year 960, belonging to the former mosque.

The cloister is accessed through a Romanesque gate from the 13th century. It has a tympanum with the Majesty of God and the Tetramorph. The columns supporting the archivolts have capitals with vegetable elements and scenes of the visit of the three Mary to Christ's sepulchre. The column of the mullion is also decorated with a reptile and with scenes of the life of Jesus. 

The tradition of the dancing egg is held at the cloister fountain since 1933.

Chapel of Corpus Christi
The Capitular Hall, dating to the mid-12th century, could be accessed from the cloister or the church. In 1330 it was converted into the Chapel of Corpus Christi It has a square plan and is covered by barrel vault. The entrance has a central door sided by windows. The keystone of the apse (added in the 14th-century) shows a Christ in Majesty, while in the arch are symbols of the Tetramorph. The apse has also a sculpture group of the Annunciation and the decorated tombstone of Alemanda de Rocabertí (died 1373).

The walls of the Hall features several 14th-century sculptures of saints, some with traces of polychrome paint.

Chapel of Santa Tecla la Antigua
Inside the cathedral's garden is the chapel of Santa Tecla l'Antiga ("St. Tecla the Ancient"), built in the 13th century in a transitional Romanesque-Gothic style. It houses the tomb of Bernat de Olivella (1287), by the master Bartolomeu of Girona.

Bell tower
The Gothic bell tower is located over the southern smaller apse, and was commissioned by bishop Roderic Tello (1289–1308). It has a prism plan enclosed in an octagonal one. The upper part (14th century) is composed of two floors, the first featuring pinnacles and windows. Over the latter is a small temple, realised in 1511, housing the bells.

The bell tower has a total height of 70 metres.

See also
 History of medieval Arabic and Western European domes

Sources

External links

Tarragona Cathedral, Cloister and Diocesan Museum Official site
Diocesan Museum  
Panoramic view  Flash required

12th-century Roman Catholic church buildings in Spain
13th-century Roman Catholic church buildings in Spain
14th-century Roman Catholic church buildings in Spain
Buildings and structures in Tarragona
Roman Catholic cathedrals in Catalonia
Gothic architecture in Catalonia
Churches completed in 1331